Fred LeRoy Porter (November 12, 1877 – September 5, 1938) was an American farmer and politician from New York.

Life
He was born on November 12, 1877, in Crown Point, Essex County, New York. He engaged in farming, especially apple growing. He married Margaret Abbot (1880–1944), and they had two children.

Porter was a member of the New York State Assembly (Essex Co.) in 1921, 1922, 1923, 1924, 1925, 1926, 1927, 1928, 1929, 1930, 1931, 1932, 1933, 1934 and 1935. He was Chairman of the Committee on Re-Organization of the State Government from 1926 to 1931; and of the Committee on Ways and Means from 1932 to 1934. He was a delegate to the 1936 Republican National Convention.

He was found dead late on the morning of September 5, 1938, on the floor of the garage at his home in Crown Point, New York, having died of a heart attack at some time during the previous night; and was buried at the Forestdale Cemetery there.

Sources

External links

1877 births
1938 deaths
People from Crown Point, New York
Republican Party members of the New York State Assembly